Pittsburgh Field Club is a private country club, established in 1882, located six miles (10 km) northeast of downtown Pittsburgh in the suburb of Fox Chapel, Pennsylvania. It rounds out an impressive quartet of courses in the suburbs northeast of Pittsburgh, along with the Longue Vue Club and Golf Course, Oakmont Country Club and the Seth Raynor-designed Fox Chapel Golf Club.

Known simply as The Field Club to Pittsburghers, it hosted the PGA Championship in 1937, where Denny Shute successfully defended his match play title. The club also hosted the Western Open in 1959 as part of Pittsburgh's bicentennial celebration. Before he won the U.S. Open in 1953 at nearby Oakmont, Ben Hogan had to qualify for the national championship at the Pittsburgh Field Club, even though he had won three of the previous five.

The course was designed by Alexander H. Findlay in August 1914.  At the time, Findlay was the premier golf course architect in the country, having perfected his design skills for decades in every corner of the country. The current layout is an amalgam that includes the efforts of Donald Ross, A.W. Tillinghast, Emil "Dutch" Loeffler, Arthur Hills, Craig Schreiner and Keith Foster in 2012.  The first tee next to the clubhouse sits high above the fairway; many members suggest aiming for the white steeple of Fox Chapel Presbyterian Church when you tee off there.  Of note is a unique feature to the course layout: An elevator from the 17th green to the 18th tee box.

Amenities at the club include: a skeet range, swimming pool, tennis and paddleball courts, privately stocked fishing lake, driving range, practice area, an 18-hole golf course and a full-service restaurant.  David Martin has served as the club pro for more than thirty-seven years.

References

The Pittsburgh Field Club: Fieldclub.org

External links
 Official website

Buildings and structures in Allegheny County, Pennsylvania
Golf clubs and courses in Pennsylvania
Pittsburgh History & Landmarks Foundation Historic Landmarks
1882 establishments in Pennsylvania